L&N Station may refer to:

 L&N Station (Knoxville)
 L&N Station (New Orleans)